Charles T. McIlhinney Jr. (born May 19, 1967) is a Republican former member of the Pennsylvania State Senate, representing the 10th District from 2007 to 2019. Previously, he was a member of the Pennsylvania House of Representatives from 1998 through 2006.

Biography
McIlhinney attended La Salle College High School, graduating in 1985, before earning a degree in finance from Bryant College in 1989. He is working towards an MBA from University of Phoenix

He was on the borough council of Doylestown, Pennsylvania from 1994 to 1996. He also served as Director of the Bucks County Office of Employment and Training.

He won election to the Pennsylvania House of Representatives in a special election on February 3, 1998. 

McIlhinney announced in January 2018 that he would retire from the state senate when his term expired in early 2019.

References

External links

Pennsylvania State Senate - Charles T. McIlhinney Jr. official PA Senate website
McIlhinney for Senate official campaign website
Pennsylvania Senate Republican Caucus - Senator Chuck McIlhinney  official caucus website
 Pennsylvania House of Representatives - Charles T. McIlhinney Jr. (Republican)  official PA House website (archived)

Republican Party Pennsylvania state senators
Republican Party members of the Pennsylvania House of Representatives
1967 births
Living people
University of Phoenix alumni
21st-century American politicians